Fashion King is a 2014 South Korean film that comically depicts the coming of age of a high school student as he matures into adulthood and discovers a passion for fashion design.

It is a film adaptation of the popular webtoon series Fashion King written by Kian84 (whose real name is Kim Hee-min), which was published on Naver from May 5, 2011, to June 6, 2013, and received four million hits.

Plot
Woo Ki-myung, a completely ordinary high school student, has a crush on Hye-jin, the prettiest, most popular girl in class. So to win her heart, he decides to transform his image and become the coolest, best dressed person in the world. As his mentor Nam-jung introduces him to the world of fashion, Ki-myung finds himself entering into a rivalry with Won-ho, the school's toughest fighter. Meanwhile, he doesn't notice Eun-jin, who harbors a secret crush on him.

Cast
Joo Won as Woo Ki-myung
Choi Jin-ri as Kwak Eun-jin
Ahn Jae-hyun as Kim Won-ho
Park Se-young as Park Hye-jin
Kim Sung-oh as Kim Nam-jung
Lee Il-hwa as Ki-myung's mother
Shin Ju-hwan as Kim Chang-joo
Min Jin-woong as Kim Doo-chi
Kim Ian as Hyuk-soo
Park Doo-shik as Sung-chul
Woo Sang-jeon as Old monk
Lee Geung-young as Won-ho's father (cameo)
Han Hye-jin as herself, MC (cameo)
Hong Seok-cheon as himself, MC (cameo)
Kim Na-young as herself, MC (cameo)
Horan (Clazziquai) as Female assistant (cameo)
Lee Joo-young as Fashion King Korea judge (cameo)
Jung Doo-young as Fashion King Korea judge (cameo)
Oh Se-il as Fashion King Korea judge (cameo)
Ahn Sun-young as Hanbok judge (cameo)
Lee Hyo-jae as Hanbok judge (cameo)
Hwang Byung-gook as Ki-myung's homeroom teacher (cameo)
Nana as Kim Hae-na (cameo)

Reception
Film received mixed reviews.Imdb rated the film  5.3/10.

References

External links
 

Fashion King webtoon at Naver 

South Korean coming-of-age comedy films
South Korean teen comedy films
South Korean romantic comedy films
Films about fashion
Films based on South Korean webtoons
Next Entertainment World films
Live-action films based on comics
2014 romantic comedy films
2010s coming-of-age comedy films
2010s teen comedy films
2010s South Korean films